John "Bugs" Hamilton (March 8, 1911, St. Louis – August 15, 1947, St. Louis) was an American jazz trumpeter.

Hamilton was a member of New York City-based trombonist Billy Kato's band in 1930-1931 and played with Chick Webb around the same time. Toward the middle of the 1930s he played with Kaiser Marshall, then joined Fats Waller's ensemble in 1938. He remained with Waller until 1942, touring and recording with him often and appearing in several films as a member of Waller's group. During World War II he played with Eddie South and Roy Eldridge, but shortly after the end of the war, he contracted tuberculosis, resulting in his death at age 36.

References

Other sources
"John "Bugs" Hamilton". The New Grove Dictionary of Jazz. 2nd edition, 2001, ed. Barry Kernfeld.

1911 births
1947 deaths
American jazz trumpeters
American male trumpeters
Musicians from St. Louis
20th-century deaths from tuberculosis
20th-century trumpeters
Jazz musicians from Missouri
20th-century American male musicians
American male jazz musicians
Tuberculosis deaths in Missouri